The 1999 Nigerian Senate election in Taraba State was held on February 20, 1999, to elect members of the Nigerian Senate to represent Taraba State. Abdulazeez Ibrahim representing Taraba Central and Dalhatu Umaru Sangari representing Taraba South won on the platform of Peoples Democratic Party, while Abdulahi Bala Adamu representing Taraba North won on the platform of the All Nigeria Peoples Party.

Overview

Summary

Results

Taraba Central 
The election was won by Abdulazeez Ibrahim of the Peoples Democratic Party.

Taraba South 
The election was won by Dalhatu Umaru Sangari of the Peoples Democratic Party.

Taraba North 
The election was won by Abdulahi Bala Adamu of the All Nigeria Peoples Party.

References 

February 1999 events in Nigeria
Tar
Taraba State Senate elections